Fosca is a municipality and town of Colombia in the Eastern Province, part of the department of Cundinamarca. Fosca borders Cáqueza and Une in the north, Quetame in the east, Guayabetal in the south and Gutiérrez in the west.

History 
In the time before the Spanish conquest, Fosca was inhabited by the Mau or Maco and Guaypi or Buchipa indigenous tribe. The Muisca, living north from the area, had a fortification of guecha warriors stationed in Fosca to defend themselves from the Guayupe people who inhabited the region south of Fosca.

About the discovery and foundation of Fosca three different versions are given; Nikolaus Federmann would have founded the town on September 1, 1538, captain Pedro de Limpias reached and discovered Fosca on his expedition from the Llanos Orientales on February 5, 1538 or Juan de Valcárcel passed through the area and moved the town centre to a different location on February 5, 1627.

Economy 
The economy of Fosca is concentrated around agriculture and livestock farming. Main agricultural products cultivated are maize, potatoes, coffee, arracacha, beans and peas.

References

Bibliography 
 

Municipalities of Cundinamarca Department
Populated places established in 1636
1636 establishments in the Spanish Empire
Muisca Confederation